The Pinch Hitter is a 1925 American silent sports comedy film directed by Joseph Henabery and starring Glenn Hunter and Constance Bennett. It is a remake of a 1917 film of the same name starring Charles Ray. It was produced and distributed by Associated Exhibitors. A print survives.

Plot
As described in a film magazine review, Joel Martin, a small town youth who is a baseball fan, becomes the butt of everyone’s jokes at college, and the going becomes worse after he falls in love with the school’s favorite waitress. He is put on the school baseball team as mascot, but when he is sent in as pinch hitter, he wins the big game and the affection of the young woman.

Cast
Glenn Hunter as Joel Martin
Constance Bennett as Abby Nettleton
Jack Drumier as Obadiah Parker
Reginald Sheffield as Alexis Thornton
Antrim Short as Jimmy Slater
George Cline as Coach Nolan

References

External links

1925 films
American silent feature films
Films directed by Joseph Henabery
First National Pictures films
American black-and-white films
American sports comedy films
1920s sports comedy films
1925 comedy films
Associated Exhibitors films
1920s American films
Silent American comedy films
1920s English-language films
Silent sports comedy films